The Shepshed Building Society was a UK building society, which had its head office in Shepshed, Leicestershire. It merged with the larger Nottingham Building Society on 1 July 2013. The three former Shepshed branches rebranded under Nottingham's name.

References

External links
Shepshed Building Society
Building Societies Association
KPMG Building Societies Database 2008
Moneysupermarket.com list of "Who Owns Who?" 2010.

Shepshed
Former building societies of the United Kingdom
Banks established in 1879
Organizations established in 1879
Banks disestablished in 2013
Companies based in Leicestershire
1879 establishments in England